Roy Alexander Franklin, OBE, (born 1953) is the chairman of Cuadrilla Resources Holdings Limited and a board member of Norwegian oil and gas company Statoil. He is a non-executive director of Amec Foster Wheeler. He has a number of other executive appointments.

References

Living people
1953 births
British chairpersons of corporations
Alumni of the University of Southampton
British geologists
Equinor people